Arthur Lovegrove (15 July 1913 – 7 November 1981) was a British actor and playwright. His comedy Goodnight Mrs Puffin starring Irene Handl, ran for 3 years in London's West End, from 1961.

Filmography

 Noose (1948) - Drummer (uncredited)
 Passport to Pimlico (1949) - Tough Man on Underground Train (uncredited)
 Meet Simon Cherry (1949) - Charlie Banks
 The Adventures of PC 49: Investigating the Case of the Guardian Angel (1949) - Bill (uncredited)
 Night and the City (1950) - Thug (uncredited)
 Waterfront (1950) - Stoker (uncredited)
 The Galloping Major (1951) - Punter (uncredited)
 Emergency Call (1952) - Gunner Terry
 The Ringer (1952) - Workman Installing Window Bars (uncredited)
 Escape Route (1952) - Phillips (uncredited)
 Three Steps to the Gallows (1953) - Tommy - coach
 Genevieve (1953) - Hotel Doorman (uncredited)
 The Steel Key (1953) - Gilchrist
 Murder at 3 a.m. (1953) - Inspector Cobb
 The Runaway Bus (1954) - 2nd Crook
 Devil on Horseback (1954) - Valet
 The Lyons in Paris (1955) - Fred (uncredited)
 Break in the Circle (1955) - Bert
 Passage Home (1955) - 1st Stoker
 A Kid for Two Farthings (1955) - Postman (uncredited)
 The Quatermass Xperiment (1955) - Sgt. Bromley (uncredited)
 They Can't Hang Me (1955) - Nick (uncredited)
 Dial 999 (1955) - George (bar owner)
 Lost (1956) - Railway Workman (uncredited)
 Jumping for Joy (1956) - Tough (uncredited)
 The Secret of the Forest (1956) - Wally 
 It's Never Too Late (1956) - Hotdog Vendor (uncredited)
 Safari (1956) - Blake
 The Weapon (1956) - (uncredited)
 The Counterfeit Plan (1957) - (uncredited)
 Carry on Admiral (1957) - Orderly
 The Steel Bayonet (1957) - Pvt. Jarvis
 The Carringford School Mystery (1958)
 A Night to Remember (1958) - Stoker (uncredited)
 Next to No Time (1958)
 Naked Fury (1959) - Syd
 Yesterday's Enemy (1959) - Patrick (uncredited)
 Wrong Number (1959) - Saunders
 The Shakedown (1960) - Barman
 The Two Faces of Dr. Jekyll (1960) - Cabby (uncredited)
 The Night We Dropped a Clanger (1961) - Sergeant
 Crooks Anonymous (1962) - Jones
 We Joined the Navy (1962) - CPO Froud
 The Marked One (1963) - Mr. Benson
 A Stitch in Time (1963) - Hotel Porter (uncredited)
 Clash by Night (1963) - Ernie Peel
 Carry On Cowboy (1965) - Old Ranchhand
 Smashing Time (1967)
 Inspector Clouseau (1968) - Innkeeper (uncredited)
 The Rise and Rise of Michael Rimmer (1970) - Studio doorman
 Eye of the Needle (1981) - Peterson
 Memoirs of a Survivor (1981) - Man at Newstand

Plays
 Nasty Things, Murders
 Just Another Day 
 Her Grace Will Be Here
 Goodnight Mrs. Puffin 
 Clara's on the Curtains! 
 Miss Adams Will Be Waiting
 There's Always Spring

References

External links
 

1913 births
1981 deaths
English male stage actors
English male film actors
English male television actors
People from Fulham
20th-century English male actors
20th-century English dramatists and playwrights
English male dramatists and playwrights
20th-century English male writers